Sir James Dillon, 3rd Earl of Roscommon ( – 1649) was an Irish magnate and politician. He was born a Catholic but converted at a young age to the Church of Ireland. He supported Strafford during his term as governor of Ireland. In the Confederate Wars and the Cromwellian conquest he was a royalist. He died in 1649, but was nevertheless included as the fifth on the list of people that were excluded from pardon in Cromwell's 1652 Act of Settlement.

Birth and origin 
James was born about 1605 in Ireland, the eldest son of Robert Dillon and his first wife Margaret Barry. His father was the second Earl of Roscommon. His family was Old English and descended from Sir Henry Dillon who came to Ireland with Prince John in 1185. His family held substantial lands in Meath, Westmeath, Longford and Roscommon.

James's mother was a daughter of David de Barry, 5th Viscount Buttevant. Her family, the de Barry family is another Old English family. Her ancestor John Barry was created Viscount Buttevant by Richard II in 1385.

James was one of five brothers including two half-brothers, who are all listed in his father's article.

Early life 
His father's family was traditionally Roman Catholic, which is why his father, despite his record of loyalty to the Crown, was never fully trusted by King Charles I of England. James, however, was converted to the Church of Ireland by James Ussher, Archbishop of Armagh.

On 24 January 1620 his grandfather was raised to the peerage with the title of Baron Dillon of Kilkenny-West, in the Peerage of Ireland. in a ceremony performed by the Lord Deputy Oliver St. John in the Presence Chamber of Dublin Castle on 25 January.

On 5 August 1622 James's grandfather was further honoured by being created Earl of Roscommon. In consequence of this advancement, Robert, the heir apparent, James's father, was styled Lord Kilkenny-West, as a courtesy title from 1622 to 1641.

Marriage and children 
In late September or early October 1636 James Dillon married Elizabeth Wentworth, daughter of Sir William  Wentworth and Anne Atkins at Lowton Hall, Essex. She was a sister of Thomas Wentworth, 1st Earl of Strafford, the formidable and (for a while), all-powerful  Lord Deputy of Ireland. James's father was a staunch supporter and a personal friend of Strafford, and the  marriage was clearly intended to strengthen English rule in Ireland through family alliances between leading English and Anglo-Irish families.

 
James and Elizabeth had a son:
Wentworth (1637–1685), 4th Earl and a poet of renown.

Parliament 
Dillon was knighted before or in 1639 and thus became Sir James Dillon. 
The same year he stood as MP, or "knight of the shire" as county MPs were then still called, for County Longford in the Parliament of 1640–1649, the second of Charles I. Sir James was elected as one of the two members for Longford County on 28 February 1640.

Parliament met on 16 March 1640. In its first session the parliament unanimously voted for four subsidies of £45,000 to raise an Irish army of 9,000 for use by the king against the Scots in the Bishops' Wars. Dillon must have voted in favour. On 31 March 1640 Wentworth prorogued parliament until the first week of June.

On 3 April 1640, Strafford (i.e. Wentworth) left Ireland, called to England by the king to help him manage the Bishops war against the Scots. Strafford appointed Christopher Wandesford as Lord Deputy to govern Ireland in his absence. Wandesford opened the second parliamentary session on 1 June 1640. News from England was the Short Parliament had refused subsidies to the king. The Irish MPs regretted having agreed to subsidies and wanted to sabotage their own action by making the subsidies difficult to evaluate and to collect. After two weeks of inconclusive discussions, Wandesford prorogued parliament on 17 June.

Parliament reconvened for the third session on 1 October. The House of Commons formed a committee for grievances that compiled a remonstrance (complaint) against Strafford. The remonstrance was then approved by the House of Commons. Sir James must have voted against it in order to support Strafford. Wandesford prorogued parliament on 12 November, a day after Strafford's impeachment in Westminster by the Long Parliament.

Parliament met again on 26 January 1641. Lord Deputy Wandesford had died on 3 December 1640 and the Irish government had devolved to the Lords Justice, Parsons and Borlase.

Earl of Roscommon 
In March 1641 James's grandfather died and his father succeeded as the second earl. His tenure was, however, a short one as he died on 27 August 1642 in Oxmantown, a residential quarter in Dublin's Northside. James succeeded as the 3rd Earl of Roscommon. He had to abandon his seat in the lower house and gained a seat in the House of Lords, which he took on the 17 November 1642.

Roscommon was in Dublin when Ormond handed the town over to the English Parliament and was given as a hostage to the English Parliament by Ormond.

Death and timeline 
He died at Limerick in October 1649, at the house of the Anglican Bishop Bramhall, of an accidental fall down a flight of stairs. According to legend, his son, then in exile at Caen, knew of his death at the moment it happened, although the official news did not reach him until two weeks later.

Notes and references

Notes

Citations

Sources 

 
 
  – 1603 to 1642
  – Scotland & Ireland
 
  – 1640 to 1641
  – N to R (for Roscommon)
  – (for timeline)
  – 1639 to 1641
 
 
  (for the subject as MP)
  – 1634 to 1699
 
 
  – Viscounts (for Dillon)
 
  – House of Lords
  – House of Commons
  – 1641 to 1643
 
 

1600s births
1649 deaths
Earls of Roscommon
Dillon, James
Members of the Parliament of Ireland (pre-1801) for County Longford constituencies
People from County Roscommon
People of the Irish Confederate Wars